Molly Moon and the Incredible Book of Hypnotism is a 2015 British fantasy film directed by Christopher N. Rowley and starring Dominic Monaghan, Lesley Manville, Emily Watson, Joan Collins and Raffey Cassidy.  It is based on Georgia Byng's 2002 novel Molly Moon's Incredible Book of Hypnotism.

Plot

Molly Moon (Raffey Cassidy) lives in an orphanage with her best friend Rocky (Jadon Carnelly-Morris) and her pug dog, Petula. After discovering a book about hypnotism, and learning how to hypnotise, she uses her powers to escape to London and star in a play on the West End. She eventually realises that being a star is not what she wants, and returns to the orphanage.

Cast
Raffey Cassidy as Molly Moon
Dominic Monaghan as Nockman
Lesley Manville as Miss Adderstone
Emily Watson as Miss Trinklebury
Celia Imrie as Edna the Cook
Anne-Marie Duff as Lucy Logan the Librarian
Ben Miller as Mr Alabaster
Sadie Frost as Mrs Alabaster
Omid Djalili as Barry Rix
Gary Kemp as Cregg
Tom Wisdom as Charlie Cooper
Fern Deacon as Hazel
Jadon Carnelly-Morris as Rocky
Tallulah Evans as Davina Nuttel
Joan Collins as Nockman's Mother Tracey

Reception

Box office
Molly Moon and the Incredible Book of Hypnotism grossed a worldwide total of $41,158. Its 2016 re-release in the United Kingdom grossed a further $1,018.

Critical response
The film has a 29% approval rating on review aggregator Rotten Tomatoes based on reviews from 14 critics, with an average rating of 4.90 out of 10. On Metacritic, the film has a weighted average score of 30 out of 100, based on 4 critic reviews, indicating "generally unfavorable reviews".

David Noh of Film Journal International praised the performances of Cassidy and Carnelly-Morris, and described the film as "Starting out deep in the 'Harry Potter' vein, but then getting sidetracked into desperately glitzy showbiz shenanigans". Noh concluded that "the movie doesn’t seem to know what it wants to be: teen musical, an adolescent fantasy of fame and fortune, a family-friendly heart-warmer or noisily rambunctious caper film. End result: Despite a handsome, well-designed production, but with a mediocre score of mostly whining emo ditties, Molly Moon succeeds in being none of these things on a satisfying level."

Reviewing the film for Variety, Scott Tobias deemed it "a chintzy children’s fantasy that summons the powers of suggestion, but falls well short of mesmeric." Frank Scheck of The Hollywood Reporter called it "a mostly wan affair that will have little appeal beyond its target audience of young girls." Dave Aldridge of Radio Times awarded the film three stars out of five and wrote, "Molly Moon is easy to criticise but hard to hate. It's corny, but it also represents an ideal fantasy fulfilment for pre-teen girls."

While praising the film's cast, Leslie Felperin of The Guardian described the adaptation as "a rebarbative mess – mirthless and shoddy like a disposable Christmas stocking novelty" and awarded it two stars out of five. Yip Wai Yee of The Straits Times awarded it two stars out of five, finding Molly's character unlikeable and the film's storytelling approach too "over-the-top and in-your-face". Sandie Angulo Chen of Common Sense Media also awarded it two stars out of five.

References

External links
 
 

2015 films
British fantasy films
Films based on British novels
Constantin Film films
Films set in London
Films about orphans
Films set in the 21st century
Films about bank robbery
Films about adoption
2010s English-language films
2010s British films